Vajrasana, Thunderbolt Pose, or Diamond Pose, is a kneeling asana in hatha yoga and modern yoga as exercise. Ancient texts describe a variety of poses under this name.

Etymology and origins

The name comes from the Sanskrit words vajra, a weapon whose name means "thunderbolt" or "diamond", and asana (आसन, āsana) meaning "posture" or "seat".

The name Vajrasana denotes a medieval meditation seat, but its usage varied. The 15th century Hatha Yoga Pradipika called it a synonym of Siddhasana, where one of the heels presses the root of the penis; according to Yoga-Mimamsa III.2 p. 135, this explains the reference to the vajra weapon.

The 17th century Gheranda Samhita 2.12 describes what Light on Yoga calls Virasana, with the feet beside the buttocks, while in other texts Vajrasana appears to mean the modern kneeling-down position, with the buttocks resting on the feet. The yoga scholar Norman Sjoman notes that Light on Yoga is unclear here, as its account of Laghuvajrasana has the knees and feet together, but it does not describe the basic Vajrasana.

Description 

The practitioner sits on the heels with the calves beneath the thighs. There is a four finger gap between the kneecaps, and the first toe of both the feet touch each other and sit erect.

Variations

The reclining form of the pose, used in Ashtanga Vinyasa Yoga, is Supta Vajrasana.

Laghuvajrasana, an advanced pose in Ashtanga Vinyasa Yoga and Iyengar Yoga, has the thighs raised halfway from the sitting position, the crown of the head on the floor and the hands grasping the ankles.

Possible contraindications

Some orthopaedic surgeons claim Vajrasana may be harmful to knees.

The pose has been linked to damage to the common fibular nerve resulting in foot drop, where dorsiflexion of the foot is compromised and the foot drags (the toe points) during walking; and in sensory loss to the surface of the foot and portions of the anterior, lower-lateral leg. In this context, one doctor has called it "yoga foot drop".

See also 
 List of asanas
 Seiza – Japanese traditional formal sitting posture
 Virasana – another kneeling asana, the name once also used for a cross-legged meditation asana

References 

Sitting asanas
Meditation asanas
Kneeling asanas
Medieval Hatha Yoga asanas

ru:Релаксационные асаны#Ваджрасана